Génova is a municipality in the Quetzaltenango department of Guatemala.

Municipalities of the Quetzaltenango Department